West Herts College is a college for further education in Watford, Hertfordshire, United Kingdom. The college has campuses in Watford, Hemel Hempstead and Kings Langley. As of 2017 the college has 5,900 students on study programmes or apprenticeships.

Range of courses
Courses offered are vocational and apprenticeships. The College works with local secondary schools to offer entry to applicants of 16 years of age and older. Some school pupils may transfer their full-time education to the College in order to restart their education or to take some vocational subjects at Level 1, either as full subjects or as "tasters" (to judge suitability). A few GCSE subjects are offered to gifted pupils.

Tertiary qualifications (foundation and extended degrees and Higher National Diplomas) are offered, overseen by the University of Hertfordshire (UH). The foundation degrees may lead on to full BA or BSc awards elsewhere, while extended degrees provide the entry requirements for a degree course at UH. In addition a number of stand-alone courses are offered to part-time students for personal development or leisure.

History

The Watford Library and School of Science and Art began in 1874 on Queens Road, Watford. A new building on Hempstead Road for the college was designed by the architects Henry Vaughan Lanchester and Thomas Arthur Lodge and construction of the large, Art Deco-style college, known as the Lanchester Building, began in 1938. The new college was located on former lands of the Cassiobury Estate, sold by the Earl of Essex. Although the stately home was demolished in 1927, the 17th-century dower house, Little Cassiobury, remained. Progress on the new building was interrupted by the advent of World War II and the building remained unfinished throughout the 1940s. Watford Technical College was founded in 1947 but it was not until 1953 that Watford Technical College was officially opened in its new premises.

In the 1980s Watford College of Technology merged with the George Stephenson College (built 1965/66) to form Watford College. West Herts College was established in 1991 as part of the reorganisation of Further Education in Hertfordshire. It was created from the two local colleges Watford College and Cassio College, and Dacorum College in Hemel Hempstead. A new Watford Campus building was constructed in the early 21st century and West Herts College vacated the Lanchester Building; now a locally listed building due to its architectural merit; the Lanchester Building is due to be converted into a primary school.

In 2017 the College was awarded a Gold rating in the Teaching Excellence Framework administered by the Higher Education Funding Council for England. That same year a merger with Stanmore College was announced, but the plans were cancelled after three months.

Former principals include Elizabeth Rushton (2004-2011), Tony Pitcher (2003-2004), and Andrew Bragg (1997 to 2003). Former Watford College principals include Terry Howard (? - 1986), Frank Baker (1986 - 1996), John Loveridge (1996 - 1997).

Controversy
During February 2018, George Duke-Cohan, a student of the college sent a threatening email stating that a bomb had been planted in the C-block of the college. The building was quickly evacuated and students were sent to the leisure centre located next to the college. Law enforcement were notified of the threat and an investigation then followed. Duke-Cohan later admitted to being the perpetrator – this resulted in his suspension from the college.

On March of the same year, Duke-Cohan sent numerous emails to over 400 schools across the UK, using hijacked email addresses from the gaming community VeltPvP. The attacks affected schools in London, Manchester, and North Yorkshire. North Yorkshire Police state the following, regarding the incident "Our cybercrime unit detectives, supported by local officers, have looked at these incidents and it is not believed there is any genuine threat". The investigation put forward resulted in the arrest of Duke-Cohan on 19 March, he was later released under investigation.

In September 2018, Duke-Cohan was rearrested after carrying out another hoax, this time targeting a United Airlines flight from the UK to San Francisco. Over the phone, he claimed to be a concerned father whose daughter was on the flight which was supposedly hijacked. Duke-Cohan then later pleaded guilty to this hoax and all of the previous charges put forward against him, and was jailed for three years after a trial at Luton Crown Court in December 2018.

Locations

The College has inherited campuses from its predecessors and now occupies sites at Watford (Hempstead Road) and Hemel Hempstead (Marlowes).

External links
 West Herts College website
 WHC at UK-Universities.net

References

Watford
Dacorum
Further education colleges in Hertfordshire
Art Deco architecture in England
Educational institutions established in 1991
1991 establishments in England